AsiaSat 6 / Thaicom 7 is a geostationary communications satellite which is operated by the Asia Satellite Telecommunications Company (AsiaSat) and was launched into orbit on 7 September 2014. The satellite project was developed in cooperation between satellite operators AsiaSat and Thaicom. AsiaSat owns half of the satellite's 28 transponders which are marketed as AsiaSat 6. The other half of the satellite is owned by Thaicom and is marketed as Thaicom 7. AsiaSat's part of the satellite is operated under license of the China (PRC), whereas Thaicom's part is operated under license of Thailand.

Satellite description 
Space Systems/Loral (SS/L), announced in November 2011 that it has been chosen by AsiaSat, to build the AsiaSat 6 and AsiaSat 8 communications satellites. AsiaSat 6 / Thaicom 7 was built by Space Systems/Loral, and is based on the LS-1300LL satellite bus. The satellite carries 28 C-band transponders and is positioned at a longitude of 120° East, providing coverage over southern Asia, Australia and New Zealand.

Launch 
SpaceX was contracted to launch AsiaSat 6 / Thaicom 7 using a Falcon 9 v1.1 launch vehicle. The launch took place from Space Launch Complex 40 (SLC-40) at the Cape Canaveral Air Force Station (CCAFS) on 7 September 2014, at.

Falcon 9 Upper stage 
The Falcon 9 upper stage used to launch AsiaSat 6 / Thaicom 7 was derelict in a decaying elliptical low Earth orbit from September to December 2014. The derelict second stage reentered the atmosphere on 28 December 2014.

Thaicom 7 
Satellite fleet operator Thaicom of Thailand has agreed in December 2011 to pay competitor AsiaSat US$171 million over 15 years for the use of one-half of an AsiaSat satellite and placed in a Thai orbital position in an arrangement that permits Thailand to preserve its rights to the orbital position under the agreement, the AsiaSat 6 satellite is at 120° East longitude. Before its launch, AsiaSat and Thaicom placed AsiaSat 2 as an interim satellite at 120° East to retain Thailand's regulatory rights to the orbital position.

See also 

 2014 in spaceflight
 List of Falcon 9 launches

References 

AsiaSat satellites
SpaceX commercial payloads
Thaicom satellites
Spacecraft launched in 2014
Satellites using the SSL 1300 bus